The statue of John the Baptist is an outdoor sculpture by Ferdinand Maxmilián Brokoff, installed at Maltézské Square in Malá Strana, Prague, Czech Republic.

External links

 

Malá Strana
Monuments and memorials in Prague
Outdoor sculptures in Prague
Sculptures depicting John the Baptist
Sculptures of men in Prague
Statues in Prague